Connie Walker (b. 1957) is an American astronomer and senior employee of the National Optical Astronomy Observatory (NOAO). She works in the NOAO's Research Based Science Education department, helping teachers develop curricula to help children learn about Astronomy. She is the director of both GLOBE at Night and Project Astro, and is a member of the board of directors of the International Dark Sky Association and the Astronomical Society of the Pacific. She was also chair of the International Year of Astronomy Dark Skies Awareness project, and continues to chair the dark skies awareness programs of Global Astronomy Month. Walker also serves on commission 50 of the International Astronomical Union.

Walker is very active in outreach and education about astronomy and light pollution.  She has worked at NOAO since 2001.

Walker was honored by having an asteroid, 29292 Conniewalker, named after her.

References 

1957 births
Living people
American women astronomers
Place of birth missing (living people)